Dennis Priestley (born 16 July 1950) is an English former professional darts player. He has won two world championships, and was the first player to win both the BDO and WDC (now PDC) world championships, in 1991 and 1994 respectively. He is nicknamed "The Menace", after the Beano character Dennis the Menace, and reflects this by wearing red and black, and using red and black flights.

Early career
Born in Mexborough, West Riding of Yorkshire, Priestley was originally a coal merchant by trade, and did not enter professional darts until he was almost 40 years old. He first caught the eye in 1989 when he reached the final of the News of the World Darts Championship where he was beaten by the experienced Dave Whitcombe. He then reached the semi-finals of the 1990 Winmau World Masters, losing to eventual champion Phil Taylor.

Rising to the top
Shortly after becoming a newsagent, Priestley won the 1991 Embassy World Championship, after beating Eric Bristow 6–0 in the final. He had defeated defending champion Taylor in his quarter-finals and 1988 champion Bob Anderson in his semi-final. He won the 1992 Winmau World Masters and also picked up many BDO Open events between 1991 and 1993.

WDC/PDC

Priestley was a founder member of the World Darts Council (WDC) which split from the British Darts Organisation in 1993. As a consequence, Priestley was precluded from assuming the role of England captain which he had been awarded shortly beforehand.

Priestley won the inaugural WDC World Darts Championship in 1994. This high point was surrounded by several wins on the WDC's new professional circuit (including the Skol Matchplay, UK Matchplay, Antwerp Open, and Samson Darts Classic) in 1993 and 1994. Since then, he has been a PDC World Championship runner-up four times, in 1996, 1997, 1998 and 2000, losing to Taylor on all four occasions. Priestley has also been a three-times World Matchplay runner-up, losing to American Larry Butler in 1994, Taylor in 1995 and Peter Evison in 1996.

Between 1991 and 1994, Priestley was the only player to win more than one grand slam/major title (he won three), while he also claimed more top professional events on either circuit than any other player and attained the number-one ranking.

Priestley's ascendancy was forcefully ended by Taylor's World Championship and World Matchplay triumphs in 1995. He did, however, notch up a further major televised title later that year – the inaugural PDC World Pairs partnering Bristow.

His 1996 World Championship Final with Taylor is often seen as one of the best matches in the history of the PDC. Although Priestley hit 15 180s and averaged 101.48 in the match, he was edged out 4–6 by the ruthless brilliance of Taylor. Priestley struck 14 180s, had a 10-dart leg and had been 2–0 up in the following year's final. Again, however, it was to no avail as Taylor won 6–3. Perhaps for matches such as these, Taylor stated in his autobiography that Priestley is the "best player [he has] ever faced". Taylor makes a similar reference to Priestley on the biography section of his website.

Other achievements
Despite living in the shadow of Taylor for much of his career, Priestley nonetheless has accomplished some unique achievements.

He is the only man to date to win both the BDO and PDC World Championships at his first attempt. Priestley won the 1991 BDO title in his first appearance in the main draw of the Lakeside event, while he won the inaugural PDC World Professional Darts Championship in 1994.

He is the first man to average over 100 in a World Championship final, when he averaged 101.48 in the 1996 WDC World Championship Final in a 4–6 loss to Taylor, despite Taylor's average being almost three points lower at 98.52. 

In 1992, Priestley entered the 1993 Embassy World Championship as the number-one seed. In his first-round tie against Jocky Wilson, he set a new record for the highest match average (102.6) at the championship, which stood until 2004. In his autobiography, Bobby Dazzler, Bobby George recalled that, during the same championship, he played Priestley in a best of nine-leg practice match. Priestley had a dart for a perfect 9-dart finish in every leg en route to recording a 5–0 win using a total of only 49 darts (10, 10, 10, 10, and 9). George stated that, although it was only a practice match, this was the greatest Lakeside performance he has ever seen and was disappointed that Priestley's surprise 2nd-round defeat to Steve Beaton cost him a substantial wager that he had understandably placed on Priestley winning his second Embassy title.

In his World Championship debut in 1991, he set a new tournament record for 180s (25). That record was broken by Mike Gregory in 1992.

Priestley held the number-one spot in the PDC world rankings between November 1994 and April 1995 and was seeded number-one for the WDC World Championships of 1995 and 1997.

In 1997, Priestley won the British Classic in Blackpool, notable for being the first BDO event which PDC players were allowed to enter – as a result of the Tomlin Order – since the 1993 split. Priestley also took the pairs title with Taylor. At around this time, Priestley also took part in a 'Battle of the Champions' contest to mark the resolution of the dispute between the governing bodies. In a match-up of 1994 World Champions, Priestley comfortably defeated Part 3-0 in sets.

Setbacks and bouncebacks
The World Matchplay was often considered as Priestley's 'bogey' event, as he has never won it despite reaching the final in the tournament's first three years. In the 1994 final, Priestley held a 7–3 in legs lead over Butler and was on course to victory, when the American alerted Priestley's attention to a distraction in the arena; Butler's intervention could have had an effect on Priestley, as Butler won eight of the next nine legs to lead 11–8, and Butler eventually won 16–12.

The following year, Priestley suffered the first of five PDC major final defeats to Taylor, losing 11–16 in legs. The World Matchplay appeared to be Priestley's for the taking in 1996 when hot-favourite Taylor was knocked out by Peter Evison, but Evison played the best darts of his life to edge Priestley 16–14 in a dramatic final. Priestley also reached the semi-finals of the event in 1999, but lost 10–17 to eventual winner Rod Harrington, with Priestley missing a dart at double 18 during the match which would have given him a Nine-dart finish and a £25,000 prize. In later years, Priestley contested some thrilling Blackpool encounters with Taylor. His 13–15 loss to Taylor in the second round of the 2005 event was followed by a 13–16 loss to Taylor in the quarter finals the following year, and his 2008 campaign came to an end courtesy of an 8–17 semi-final exit.

Though Priestley has won a number of non-televised ranking events over the years, he has underachieved and on some occasions under-performed on the big stage; his failed turn his performances into further World title victories. Indeed, Priestley was close to quitting darts in 2003, unhappy with his form over the previous couple of years and had problems with his eyesight. He returned to better form in 2005 following his World Matchplay epic against Taylor. That year he reached his first major semi-final in five years at the World Grand Prix in Dublin. Priestley repeated that feat the following year and ended 2006 with a top-three ranking behind Taylor and Colin Lloyd.

Friendship and rivalry with Phil Taylor
Priestley is good friends with Taylor, who describes Priestley as a darting "soul-mate" in his autobiography. During the early years of the PDC, Priestley and Taylor had an agreement where they would share prize money won at events. The arrangement lasted between 1994 and 2000 and made sound financial sense given that, in Taylor's words, they "cherry-picked most tournaments" (contesting 5 of the 7 World Championship Finals in that time) and also struggled for exhibition work due to the dispute with the BDO. The agreement eventually ended when the prize money grew to a level where the players could individually sustain a better living and this ironically coincided with Priestley's sharp dip in form.

Taylor and Priestley first met in major competition in the 1990 World Masters. Taylor won that semi final encounter en route to the title. Priestley quickly assumed the upper hand in their rivalry, however, as he defeated Taylor in the quarter finals of the 1991 World Championship, where Priestley trailed 1–3 and survived two match darts against him in the fifth set, before coming back to win the match, hitting a 161 outshot in the final leg of the match to win 4–3 in sets. Priestley went on to win the 1991 World Championship. Priestley defeated Taylor again later in the year in the 1991 British Matchplay final. Their early meetings in the WDC were also won by Priestley, who defeated Taylor in the quarter finals of the very first WDC event, the 1992 Lada UK Masters, and in the final of the very first WDC World Championship in 1994, the latter seeing Priestley win by 6–1 in sets. Priestley also defeated Taylor in the Last 16 of the 1995 UK Matchplay, before Taylor beat Priestley in the 1995 World Matchplay final.

The peak of the Taylor/Priestley rivalry arguably came in the 1996 WDC World Championship Final. Although Taylor was, at 1/6, an excessively hot favourite after his 1995 successes of winning both the World Championship and the World Matchplay, while Priestley was quoted at excessively long odds of 7/2, the match was very evenly poised: Taylor was the defending champion and reigning World Matchplay champion, while Priestley was the former champion and reigning World Pairs champion. Both players had conceded only a handful of sets between them en route to the final and produced (statistically) the greatest World Final ever at the time: not only was Priestley's average of 101.48 a landmark, Taylor's winning average of 98.52 was also higher than any previous World Finalist. Taylor won 6–4 in sets.

The 1997 WDC World Championship Final was of a similarly high standard. A barrage of 180s took Priestley to an early 2–0 lead in sets before Taylor's brutal scoring and ruthless finishing put him in command. Trailing 2–4 in sets and 0–2 in legs, Priestley recovered to 2–2 in legs before clinching the set with a 160 checkout against the throw. Priestley found himself 0–2 down in the following set. Again he recovered to 2–2 before fractionally missing a 140 checkout for a similar escape, which would have made the match all square at 4–4. Taylor won that set to lead 5–3 in sets, and then won the next for a 6–3 win. Ironically, a year earlier in the 1996 WDC World Championship final, Priestley had similarly trailed 3–4 in sets and 0–2 in legs, recovered to 2–2 and just missed a 132 checkout (bull, bull, double 16) before losing the set.

Although only one set 'against the throw' proved decisive in both the 1996 and 1997 WDC World Championship finals, the 1998 PDC World Championship final proved to be the most one-sided in the history of the World Darts Championship. Becoming the only duo to contest three successive World Finals, Taylor and Priestley were unable to produce another epic contest. This time Taylor won 6–0 in sets and lost just 2 legs in the whole match (3–0, 3–0, 3–0, 3–0, 3–2, 3–0). Taylor's win evidenced a cross-roads in their respective careers. While Priestley started getting some motivational problems and struggled to remain at the top of the PDC ranks, Taylor had already cemented an era of unprecedented domination and consistent 100+ averages.

Despite this setback, however, Priestley bounced back to reach his sixth World Championship Final in 2000. An average of 98 gave him a 5–2 semi-final win over top seed Peter Manley, while Taylor blitzed into the final without losing a set. The form of both players subsequently dipped in the final, where – from 3–2 2–2 – Taylor pulled away to a 7–3 win.

In somewhat nostalgic fashion, the pair provided another epic contest in the early rounds of the 2004 World Championship. After Taylor took the opening 2 sets, Priestley won 7 of the next 10 legs before a relieved Taylor wrapped up a 4–1 win, which looked more one-sided on paper than it really was.

Priestley's last win against Taylor came in a non-televised ranking event in 2006. Although his last major victory over Taylor came in 1994, Darts commentators such as John Gwynne have noted that a vast number of their subsequent encounters have been close and exciting affairs – something not always reflected by the scorelines.

Perhaps for this reason, Priestley is highly regarded by Sid Waddell who, in the documentary "the Power and the Glory" commented that "Priestley was the only one (in Darts) who could do anything with [Taylor]" between 1994 and 1998, while Bristow endorsed the 1996 WDC World Championship Final because "Priestley didn't drop from the 100 average he played against other players" when faced with Taylor.

In the same documentary, Waddell stated that – at the start of the WDC/PDC in 1993 – he thought that "Priestley would have a few years all to himself" on the circuit. Although Taylor's relentless domination of the circuit from 1995-onwards did not allow this to be, Priestley's superiority over Taylor between 1991 and 1994, and Priestley's brilliant form for most of 1994 in particular, gives requisite justification for such a view.

The continuing closeness between the two legends was evident when Taylor was close to tears after comfortably beating Priestley 8–0 in the 2009 Las Vegas Desert Classic.

Recent years
In January 2007, Priestley made his debut in the Premier League Darts, the respected darts competition in which eight of the best players from the PDC circuit compete against each other in a league format, with matches held across Great Britain at different venues. Priestley took the tournament by storm in the opening weeks, complementing hammerings of Roland Scholten and Adrian Lewis with a draw against Taylor and hard fought wins over Terry Jenkins, Colin Lloyd, and van Barneveld. Although he failed to maintain that form, Priestley's good start proved sufficient to earn him a semi-final place. Once again, however, he went down to a brave (6–11 in legs) loss to eventual winner Taylor.

In February 2007, he won the UK Open South-West Regional tournament, beating James Wade in the final. Priestley's form dipped later in 2007, although this was greatly overshadowed by his battle with prostate cancer.

Priestley failed to qualify for the Grand Slam of Darts in 2009, but he did win the US Open. Taylor chose not to participate in the event.

Priestley exited the 2010 PDC World Championship in the first round after losing 3–2 to Kevin McDine. He exited the 2011 PDC World Championships in the second round of the tournament after losing 4–2 to Gary Anderson.

In the 2011 season, Priestley dropped out of the top 32 in the PDC Order of Merit meaning he would have to try to qualify for the World Championship via the PDPA Qualifying tournament and was narrowly beaten at the Quarter Final stage 5–4 by Joe Cullen after throwing away a 4–0 lead in that match. This meant that Priestley would not be taking part in the World Championship for the first time in 20 years despite still showing some world class form at the previous months Championship League of Darts.

In 2012, Priestley qualified for the 2012 UK Open, where he lost in the fifth round to eventual winner Robert Thornton. He also qualified for his first European Tour Event, the Dutch Darts Masters, and was beaten 3–6 by Andy Smith in the first round. In November, Priestley reached the final of the Players Championship 17 in Crawley, where he was beaten 2–6 by Simon Whitlock, having defeated an in-form Michael van Gerwen 6–1 in the semi-finals, despite his opponent averaging 105. His run to the final and successive quarter-final defeats in the last two events secured his qualification for the World Championship in December through the ProTour Order of Merit. He played Ronnie Baxter in the first round and lost 1–3.

Priestley only entered a handful of events in 2013 and his best finish came in May at the third Players Championship where he lost 6–2 in the quarter-finals to Robert Thornton. Despite this, he still had a tour card for 2014, as he was world number 51 at the start of the season, inside the top 64.

At the start of 2015, Dennis announced that he had retired from professional darts, but would still do exhibitions.

Personal life
Away from darts, Priestley is married to Jenny and has 4 children. He has 2 granddaughters. Dennis is also a massive football fan. He supports Barnsley and Manchester United.

In November 2007, Priestley was diagnosed with prostate cancer and issued a statement through the PDC regarding his health. He was forced to withdraw from the John McEvoy Darts Classic in Ireland with pains in his abdomen having been diagnosed with the disease in the run up to the event. He had stated his thoughts were to undergo surgery at some point in early 2008, however, after losing 5–2 to Van Barneveld in the second round of the Grand Slam of Darts (despite averaging 103.5), he announced that he would be making arrangements to undergo surgery in the days following the event. This did not prevent him taking his place in the 2008 World Championship where he lost in the first round to Steve Maish.

After an extended period of treatment and recuperation, Priestley returned to the PDC circuit in May 2008. He quickly regained his form and reached the semi-finals of the US Open where he was beaten, once again, by Taylor. He also lost to Taylor again after a terrific run to the semis of the 2008 World Matchplay.

World Championship results

BDO

1991: Winner (beat Eric Bristow 6–0)
1992: 2nd Round (lost to Alan Warriner-Little 2–3)
1993: 2nd Round (lost to Steve Beaton 1–3)

PDC

1994: Winner (beat Phil Taylor 6–1)
1995: Group Stage (lost to John Lowe 0–3) & (beat Jocky Wilson 3–2)
1996: Runner Up (lost to Phil Taylor 4–6)
1997: Runner Up (lost to Phil Taylor 3–6)
1998: Runner Up (lost to Phil Taylor 0–6)
1999: 1st Round (lost to John Ferrell 0–3)
2000: Runner Up (lost to Phil Taylor 3–7)
2001: 1st Round (lost to Keith Deller 2–3)
2002: Quarter-finals (lost to Dave Askew 2–6)
2003: 2nd Round (lost to Dennis Smith 1–4)
2004: 4th Round (lost to Phil Taylor 1–4)
2005: 4th Round (lost to Phil Taylor 0–4)
2006: 2nd Round (lost to Adrian Lewis 2–4)
2007: 3rd Round (lost to Andy Hamilton 1–4)
2008: 1st Round (lost to Steve Maish 1–3)
2009: 3rd Round (lost to Paul Nicholson 2–4)
2010: 1st Round (lost to Kevin McDine 2–3)
2011: 2nd Round (lost to Gary Anderson 2–4)
2013: 1st Round (lost to Ronnie Baxter 1–3)

Career finals

BDO major finals: 3 (3 titles)

PDC major finals: 8 (1 titles, 7 runners-up)

Independent major finals: 1 (1 runner-up)

Performance timeline

References

External links
 Dennis Priestley's website
 Darts Database player profile
 Dartsmad player profile

1950 births
English darts players
Living people
PDC world darts champions
People from Mexborough
Sportspeople from Doncaster
Professional Darts Corporation founding players
British Darts Organisation players
BDO world darts champions
Professional Darts Corporation Hall of Fame